Soekarja Somadikarta (born 21 April 1930) is an Indonesian ornithologist and a professor emeritus at the University of Indonesia. He has been described as "the father of Indonesian Ornithology who also pioneered the forerunner of systematic bird observation research in Indonesia."

The Togian white-eye (Zosterops somadikartai), a bird found in the Togian islands of Indonesia, was named in honor of Soekarja Somadikarta.

He won the 2011 Habibie Award.

Articles
</ref>

References

1930 births
Living people
Indonesian zoologists
Academic staff of the University of Indonesia